The Cornish Stadium was a greyhound racing track and speedway venue in Par Moor Road, St Austell, Cornwall.

Opening
The track opened in May 1949 for speedway and was located on the north side of Par Moor Road and south side of St Austell Road.

Greyhound racing
Independent (unaffiliated to a governing body) greyhound racing took place form 11 July 1958 until 1986 over race distances of 250, 458, 650 and 860 metres.

Speedway

Speedway took place from 1949 until 1964.

Motor sports
Stock car racing took place between 1980 and 1987 shortly before the closure of the stadium. Sidecar Racing, Midget Racing and Go Karts were also held at the venue.

Closure
The stadium was redeveloped into the Cornish Market World in 1988.

References

Defunct greyhound racing venues in the United Kingdom
Defunct speedway venues in England
Defunct sports venues in Cornwall
Sports venues completed in 1949